Gaetano D'Agostino (born 3 June 1982) is an Italian former professional football midfielder and current coach. Usually a playmaker, D'Agostino is best known for his incisive passing.

Club career

Early career
D'Agostino was brought up in the Palermo youth system, in Roma youth system only for two seasons because he was progressing enormously and, in 2001, went to Bari with co-ownership rights as part of the deal that brought Antonio Cassano to Roma. He was tagged for 5 billion Italian lire for 50% of the rights. He then came back to Roma for €1,291,142 and signed a new three-year contract in June 2003 in but did not figure much.

Messina
In January 2005 he was loaned to Messina on loan with option to sign in co-ownership deal for €750,000. In half a season at Messina, he made 42 appearances and scored 4 goals, being instrumental for the club's impressive performances in the Serie A league, including a seventh place in 2004–05, the best top flight placement in Messina history.

In June 2006 Messina bought the remaining rights for €60,000.

Udinese
On 7 July 2006, he was bought by Udinese for a reported €1.2 million, where he firmly established himself as a regular, also achieving a place in the Italy national team during his stay with the Friuli-based side. He made sensational performances during the 2008–2009 Serie A season.

Fiorentina
On 3 June 2010, he was sold to Fiorentina for a reported fee between €9 and 10 million. La Viola later announced they signed him in a co-ownership deal, for €5.75 million. He made his debut on 29 August 2010, scoring Fiorentina's only goal in a 1–1 draw at home against Napoli.

After the injury of Riccardo Montolivo, D'Agostino partnered with Marco Donadel as the central midfielders.

Joining Siena via Udinese
In the middle of 2011, D'Agostino returned to Udinese after they won his 50% rights in a blind auction, Udinese winning with a bid of €110,000 to €50,000. D'Agostino said that “It still hurts a little that Fiorentina didn’t keep me,” and expressed his desire to remain in Florence, having earlier said he loved living in the city. On 7 July, Siena agreed a deal to sign the playmaker.

He left Siena at the end of the 2013–14 season, after the club declared bankruptcy.

International career
D'Agostino was a member of the Italy U-21 squad, making 17 appearances and scoring 4 goals.

He received his first senior call-up in November 2008, but did not play, making his debut on 6 June 2009 in a friendly match against Northern Ireland.

Coaching career
After retirement, he took over a head coaching role at Serie D amateurs Anzio in 2016.

In June 2017 he was named new head coach of Lega Pro club Virtus Francavilla.
On 12 June 2018, he was appointed as coach of Alessandria, signing a two-year contract. He left the club on 17 February 2019.

On 4 October 2019, he was hired as head coach of Serie C club Lecco.

On 27 June 2021, he joined Vibonese. He was sacked on 14 February 2022, with Vibonese in last place in the league table.

References

External links
 Profile at La Gazetta dello Sport 2009–10 

1982 births
Living people
Footballers from Palermo
Association football midfielders
Italian footballers
Italy youth international footballers
Italy under-21 international footballers
Italy international footballers
A.S. Roma players
S.S.C. Bari players
A.C.R. Messina players
Udinese Calcio players
ACF Fiorentina players
A.C.N. Siena 1904 players
Delfino Pescara 1936 players
S.S. Fidelis Andria 1928 players
Benevento Calcio players
Serie A players
Serie B players
Serie C players
Italian football managers
U.S. Alessandria Calcio 1912 managers
Calcio Lecco 1912 managers
Serie C managers